Tsagan Aman (Ţağan Amn) is a rural locality (a settlement) and the administrative center of Yustinsky District and of the Tsagan Aman Rural Settlement in the Republic of Kalmykia, Russia. Tsagan Aman was founded in 1798. Population:

References

Notes

Sources

Rural localities in Kalmykia
Yustinsky District